Robert Alfred Wolff (November 29, 1920 – July 15, 2017) was an American radio and television sportscaster.

He began his professional career in 1939 on CBS in Durham, North Carolina while attending Duke University. He was the radio and TV voice of the Washington Senators from 1947 to 1960, continuing with the team when they relocated and became the Minnesota Twins in 1961. In 1962, he joined NBC-TV.

In his later years, Wolff was seen and heard on News 12 Long Island, on MSG Network programming and doing sports interviews on the Steiner Sports' Memories of the Game show on the YES Network.

Personal life
Wolff was born in New York City; he was the son of Estelle (Cohn), a homemaker, and Richard Wolff, a professional engineer. He was a graduate of Duke University with Phi Beta Kappa and Omicron Delta Kappa honors.  Wolff served in the U.S. Navy as a supply officer in the Pacific during World War II, ending his service as a lieutenant.

He was a longtime resident of South Nyack, New York.  His son Rick Wolff is an author, radio host for WFAN and former baseball player and coach.

National broadcasting work
Bob Wolff was the longest running sports broadcaster in television and radio history. He is a recipient of the Ford C. Frick Award from the Baseball Hall of Fame and the Curt Gowdy Media Award from the Basketball Hall of Fame. Wolff has also been honored with induction into Madison Square Garden's Walk of Fame, the National Sportscasters and Sportswriters Hall of Fame, Sigma Nu fraternity Hall of Fame, and many others.

Wolff was a professional broadcaster in nine decades. Seen and heard on two ESPN TV specials in 2008, he had been on the Madison Square Garden Network since 1954 and on Cablevision's News 12 Long Island since 1986.

Wolff became the pioneer TV voice of the Washington Senators in 1947, and moved with the team to Minnesota in 1961. In 1962 he joined NBC as the play-by-play man on the TV Baseball Game-of-the-Week, where he worked until 1965.

Also heard on Mutual's Game-of-the-Day, Wolff was selected to be a World Series broadcaster in 1956 and that year called Don Larsen's perfect game across the country on the Mutual Broadcast System and around the world on the Armed Forces radio. He also was on NBC Radio for the World Series in 1958 and 1961.

Wolff was seen and heard doing play-by-play on all the major TV networks. Another of his classic broadcasts was the NY Giants / Baltimore Colts 1958 NFL Championship Game called, "The Greatest Game Ever Played". On the collegiate scene, he broadcast the Rose Bowl, Sugar Bowl, Gator Bowl, and many others. Wolff was the television play-by-play voice of the Detroit Pistons for multiple seasons.

Wolff was also an announcer for the Westminster Kennel Club Dog Show, the National Horse Show, the Garden's college and pro basketball and hockey games, men and women's tennis, track and boxing events as well as gymnastics and bowling. He did soccer games for the old Tampa Bay Rowdies.

New York Knicks and New York Rangers
Wolff became known regionally as television's play-by-play voice for eight teams in five different sports – the New York Knicks and Detroit Pistons of the NBA as well as the New York Rangers of the NHL, the Washington Senators/Minnesota Twins of MLB, the Baltimore Colts, Washington Redskins and Cleveland Browns of the NFL, and soccer's Tampa Bay Rowdies of the initial North American Soccer League.

He was one of very few American play-by-play announcers to have covered each of the four major team sports leagues as well as soccer with Dale Arnold being the other, calling Boston Bruins, Celtics, Red Sox, Patriots, and Revolution.

For many years Wolff was the play-by-play telecaster for all events originating from Madison Square Garden.

His broadcast partner with the Knicks for many years was Cal Ramsey.

Memorable calls
In addition to broadcasting Don Larsen's perfect World Series game and the Colts' first overtime championship title win over the New York Giants, Wolff called Jackie Robinson's last major league hit that won Game 6 of the 1956 World Series. He was also the TV voice of the New York Knicks' only two championships, in 1970 and in 1973.

Death
Wolff died on July 15, 2017 at his home in South Nyack, New York at the age of 96.

References

External links
Bob Wolff Ford C. Frick Award biography at the National Baseball Hall of Fame
DAVID DUPREE and BOB WOLFF 2008 RECIPIENTS OF PRESTIGIOUS CURT GOWDY MEDIA AWARD
Bob Wolff Receives Curt Gowdy Media Award
Sigma Nu Fraternity Hall of Fame
Bob Wolff - 85 Going On 15

1920 births
2017 deaths
United States Navy personnel of World War II
American radio sports announcers
American television sports announcers
Association football commentators
Baltimore Colts announcers
Bowling broadcasters
Boxing commentators
Cleveland Browns announcers
College basketball announcers in the United States
College football announcers
Detroit Pistons announcers
Duke University alumni
Ford C. Frick Award recipients
Jewish American sportspeople
Major League Baseball broadcasters
Minnesota Twins announcers
National Basketball Association broadcasters
National Football League announcers
National Hockey League broadcasters
New York Knicks announcers
New York Rangers announcers
People from South Nyack, New York
Television personalities from New York City
Tennis commentators
Washington Senators (1901–1960) announcers
North American Soccer League (1968–1984) commentators
21st-century American Jews